Displaced may refer to:

 Forced displacement, the involuntary movement of people from their home
 Displaced (2006 film), a 2006 British feature film produced by Skylandian Pictures
 Displaced (2010 film), a 2010 American documentary directed by Idil Ibrahim
 "Displaced" (Star Trek: Voyager), an episode of Star Trek: Voyager